Giuseppe Lahoz Ortiz, also known as Giuseppe La Hoz (Mantua, 1766 — Ancona, 13 September 1799) was an Italian general, Jacobin and patriot, who served the Austrian Empire, the Cisalpine Republic and then fought in the Italian anti-French insurrections in 1799.

Biography

References
This article is based on a translation of the equivalent article of the Italian Wikipedia

1766 births
1799 deaths
Italian generals
Italian military personnel of the Napoleonic Wars
Italian commanders of the Napoleonic Wars